David Johnson (October 3, 1782January 7, 1855) was the 62nd Governor of South Carolina from 1846 to 1848.

Early life and career
Born in Louisa County, Virginia, Johnson was educated in York County, but moved with his family to Chester District in 1789. He studied law in South Carolina and became a solicitor of the Union District in 1812 as well as being elected to the South Carolina House of Representatives. Excelling in law, Johnson was made a circuit judge in 1815, a judge of the Court of Appeals in 1824, a presiding judge of the Court of Appeals in 1830 and a chancellor in 1835. During his time on the bench, Johnson was a noted Unionist because of his decision to strike down a militia oath to South Carolina and his view that a violation of a law of the United States was a violation of the law of South Carolina. His son-in-law was Confederate General John A. Wharton.

As governor
The General Assembly elected Johnson as Governor of South Carolina in 1846 for a two-year term. The Mexican–American War occurred during his administration and the state aptly supported the cause. Much discussed was the Wilmot Proviso which would have outlawed slavery in the territory acquired from Mexico as a result of the war and it helped to further push the state towards the brink of secession. A Unionist would not become Governor of South Carolina again until the end of the Civil War when Benjamin Franklin Perry was appointed by President Andrew Johnson.

Later life
After his term as governor, Johnson returned to Upstate South Carolina where he died on January 7, 1855. He was buried at Forest Lawn Cemetery in Union.

References

External links
SCIway Biography of David Johnson
NGA Biography of David Johnson

1782 births
1855 deaths
University of South Carolina alumni
South Carolina lawyers
Democratic Party members of the South Carolina House of Representatives
Democratic Party governors of South Carolina
University of South Carolina trustees
South Carolina state solicitors
19th-century American politicians
19th-century American lawyers